Mazara Khurd is a village in Shaheed Bhagat Singh Nagar district of Punjab State, India. The village is administrated by Sarpanch an elected representative of the village.

Demography 
As of 2011, Mazara Khurd has a total number of 105 houses and population of 488 of which 247 include are males while 241 are females according to the report published by Census India in 2011. The literacy rate of Mazara Khurd is 74.11% lower than the state average of 75.84%. The population of children under the age of 6 years is 40 which is 8.20% of total population of Mazara Khurd, and child sex ratio is approximately 1222 as compared to Punjab state average of 846.

Most of the people are from Schedule Caste which constitutes 37.30% of total population in Mazara Khurd. The town does not have any Schedule Tribe population so far.

As per the report published by Census India in 2011, 133 people were engaged in work activities out of the total population of Mazara Khurd which includes 124 males and 9 females. According to census survey report 2011, 96.99% workers describe their work as main work and 3.01% workers are involved in Marginal activity providing livelihood for less than 6 months.

Education 
KC Engineering College and Doaba Khalsa Trust Group Of Institutions are the nearest colleges.

List of schools nearby:
Dashmesh Model School, Kahma
Govt Primary School, Kahlon
Govt High School, Garcha

Transport 

See also 
List of villages in India

References

External links 
 Tourism of Punjab
 Census of Punjab
 Locality Based PINCode

Villages in Shaheed Bhagat Singh Nagar district